Sutherland School may refer to:
 Sutherland School, Sutherland, Saskatoon, Canada
 Sutherland Secondary School, North Vancouver, British Columbia, Canada
 Sutherland High School (disambiguation)
 Scott Sutherland School of Architecture and Built Environment, Robert Gordon University, Aberdeen, Scotland
 Sutherland School of Law, University College Dublin, Ireland

See also
 :Category:Schools in Sutherland
 Sutherland (disambiguation)